The Innocence of Ruth is a 1916 American silent drama film directed by John H. Collins and starring Edward Earle, Viola Dana and Augustus Phillips.

Cast
 Edward Earle as Jimmy Carter
 Viola Dana as Ruth Travers
 Augustus Phillips as Mortimer Reynolds
 Lena Davril as Edna Morris
 T. Tamamoto as Togo
 Brad Sutton as Mr. Travers
 Nellie Grant as Housekeeper
 Robert Brower as Stock Broker

References

Bibliography
 John T. Weaver. Twenty Years of Silents, 1908-1928. Scarecrow Press, 1971.

External links
 

1916 films
1916 drama films
1910s English-language films
American silent feature films
Silent American drama films
American black-and-white films
Films directed by John H. Collins
Edison Studios films
1910s American films